The David Bruce LM–5000 Pairs bridge event is held at the Summer American Contract Bridge League (ACBL) North American Bridge Championship. It is open to all players who have earned Life Master status up to 5,000 masterpoints.
The event is held at the same time as the Von Zedtwitz Life Master Pairs (open to all Life Masters) and the
Young LM-1500 Pairs event.

The trophy is named in honor of David Bruce, the first player to achieve Life Master status in the ACBL.

Winners

Sources

List of previous winners, Page 5

2009 winners, Page 1

External links
 Special Conditions of Contest for the Bruce LM-5000 Pairs. Retrieved from the ACBL official website December 28, 2016.

North American Bridge Championships